This is a list of released and upcoming Xbox Live games for Windows 8 and Windows RT. The first wave of Windows 8 Xbox games list was announced by Xbox Live expert Major Nelson on August 31, 2012. All Xbox Live games on Windows 8 made available on the Windows Store and released on October 26, 2012, onwards. There are currently 50 (Upcoming games: 11; Existing games: 39) games on this list.

Released games

Upcoming games

See also

 List of Games for Windows titles
 List of Games for Windows – Live titles
 Windows Games on Demand

References

Notes
Exclusive to one or more Microsoft platforms

Xbox
Xbox